David Mark Kennet (born February 10, 1957, in Erie, Pennsylvania, United States) is an independent economic consultant. He has previously been on the faculties of three universities and written a number of professional journal articles and has authored or co-authored two books.

Education 
Kennet attended Carnegie Mellon University, where he obtained a B.S. in 1980 (economics and mathematics); and the University of Wisconsin, where he earned an M.S. in 1986 and a Ph.D. in 1988, both in economics. His dissertation advisor was John Rust.

Career 
Kennet began working at the Pennsylvania Governor's Energy Council in 1980. After completing his doctoral degree at Wisconsin, he began an academic career at the University of California, Santa Cruz economics department. He began his collaboration with David Gabel during these years, a collaboration which continues to bear investigative fruit throughout Kennet's career in economics and regulation. He spent several years afterward (1989–1992) at Tulane University's economics department. Moving to Washington, he worked for a number of years as a researcher at the U.S. Bureau of Labor Statistics, and was seconded briefly to the U.S. Bureau of the Census to work as a researcher in the Center for Economic Studies. In 1997, he accepted a position as senior economist at the Federal Communications Commission, where he was part of a group of economists and engineers who developed the Hybrid Cost Proxy Model (HCPM), a network simulation tool utilized for determining the forward-looking economic cost of telecommunications networks. HCPM was a logical extension of his earlier work with Gabel in the development of another network simulation tool, the Local Exchange Cost Optimization Model (LECOM). While at the FCC, Kennet taught graduate econometrics at Johns Hopkins University as an adjunct professor.

Leaving the FCC, Kennet accepted a position as associate professor at the George Washington University in the graduate telecommunications program while working as an outside consultant to the World Bank (1999–2001). During this period, he developed the early versions of the Wireless Cost Optimization Model (WICOM). In 2001, he was offered a position as a special economic advisor to Osiptel, the Organismo Supervisor para la Inversión Privada en Telecomunicaciones, in Lima, Peru. In 2004, he became an independent consultant, specializing in the economic analysis of regulated industries in general and telecommunications in particular, working both completely independently and as part of various groups and teams.

Kennet was invited to speak to the Peruvian Congress in November 2008 on the issue of numerical portability, and was interviewed by the Peruvian daily Expreso, and the Mexican television station Televisa. He was also interviewed by Peruvian Channel 7 on the possibility of implementing free Internet in Peru.

Countries 
Kennet has worked in over 20 countries as a consultant or professor. These include Armenia, Zambia, Peru, Ecuador, Mexico, Portugal, Argentina and wide swathes of the Middle East and Africa.

Selected publications 
 "Did Airline Deregulation Affect Aircraft Engine Maintenance? An Empirical Policy Analysis", The RAND Journal of Economics, 1993.
 "A Structural Model of Aircraft Engine Maintenance", Journal of Applied Econometrics, 1994.
 "Economies of Scope in the Local Telephone Exchange Market" (with D. Gabel), Journal of Regulatory Economics, 1994.
 "The Effect of Cellular Service on the Cost Structure of a Land-Based Telephone Network" (with D. Gabel), Telecommunications Policy, 1997.
 "Fully Distributed Cost Pricing, Ramsey Pricing, and Shapley Value Pricing: A Simulated Welfare Analysis for the Telephone Exchange" (with D. Gabel), Review of Industrial Organization, 1997.
 "Innovations in Economic Measurement: Comments", Proceedings of the Joint Statistical Meetings of the American Statistical Association, Section on Government Statistics, 2000.
 "Measuring Productivity Change for Regulatory Purposes" (with N. Uri), Journal of Media Economics, 2001.
 "Computer Modeling of the Forward-Looking Economic Cost of Local Exchange Telephone Networks: An Optimization Approach2" (with W.W. Sharkey, J. Prisbrey, C. Bush, and V. Gupta), Telecommunication Systems, 2001.
 Cost Proxy Models and Telecommunications Policy: A New Empirical Approach to Regulation (with W. W. Sharkey, J.-J. Laffont, and F. Gasmi), MIT Press, 2002 (also in Chinese). 
 "Beyond the Rhetoric: An Introduction to TELRIC" (with R. Perez-Reyes), Review of Network Economics, 2002.
 "The Potential Role of Economic Cost Models in the Regulation of Telecommunications in Developing Countries" (with D. Benitez, A. Estache, and C. Ruzzier), Information Economics and Policy 14(1), 2002, pp. 21–38.
 "Efficient Interconnection Charges and Capacity-Based Pricing" (with E. Ralph), International Economics and Economic Policy, 2007.
 "Cargos de Interconexión Eficientes y Cargos por Capacidad en Telecomunicaciones", Revista de Regulación en Infraestructura de Transporte, 2008.

Notes

External links 
 

Jewish American writers
1957 births
Living people
Carnegie Mellon University alumni
University of Wisconsin–Madison College of Letters and Science alumni
21st-century American economists